Theatre of Tragedy is the first studio album by the Norwegian gothic metal band Theatre of Tragedy. The album was issued in the US by Century Media Records in 1998.

Track listing

Personnel

Theatre of Tragedy
Raymond I. Rohonyi - vocals, lyrics
Liv Kristine - vocals
Pål Bjåstad - guitar
Tommy Lindal - guitar
Eirik T. Saltrø - bass guitar
Lorentz Aspen - keyboards
Hein Frode Hansen - drums

Guest musicians
Anders Måreby - cello on tracks 4 and 5

Production
Dan Swanö - engineering, mixing with Theatre of Tragedy

References

External links
 

Theatre of Tragedy albums
1995 debut albums
Massacre Records albums